Kushneria konosiri is a Gram-negative, obligately aerobic and motile bacterium from the genus of Kushneria which has been isolated from the seafood Daemi-jeot.

References

Oceanospirillales
Bacteria described in 2017